Alia or ALIA may refer to:

People
Alia (name), a list of people with the surname or given name

Places
Alia, Sicily, Italy, a comune
 Alia (Phrygia), a town of ancient Phrygia which remains a Roman Catholic titular bishopric
Alía, Spain, a municipality in Extremadura
El Alia, Tunisia, a town and commune in the Bizerte Governorate

Other uses
Alia (gastropod), a genus of molluscs
Alia, the former name of Royal Jordanian Airlines
Australian Library and Information Association (ALIA)

See also
 Aaliyah (1979–2001), American R&B singer
 Aaliyah (disambiguation)
 Aliya (disambiguation)
 Aliyah (disambiguation)
 Allia (moth), a genus in the family Noctuidae
 Allia, a tributary of the River Tiber, Italy
 Battle of the Allia, fought  BC between the Romans and the Senones
 Alya (disambiguation)